In mathematics, a complex line is a one-dimensional affine subspace of a vector space over the complex numbers. A common point of confusion is that while a complex line has dimension one over C (hence the term "line"), it has dimension two over the real numbers R, and is topologically equivalent to a real plane, not a real line.

See also
 Algebraic geometry
 Complex vector
 Riemann sphere

References

Geometry
Complex analysis